Internal Exile is the first album by the Los Angeles Chicano punk band Los Illegals. The songs on the album deal with issues such as immigration, poverty, street gangs, violence, and alienation. The band toured to promote the album, and began to record tracks for their second album entitled "Burning Youth."  The second album was not released because of differences with their label, A&M, and the album was never released.

Singles

One single was released from the album, El Lay, in 1981. It was written by Willie Herrón and his artist friend and Gronk. It describes the trials and tribulations of a Mexican-American life in Los Angeles.

Track listing
A1 - El Lay
A2 - Secret Society 	
A3 - We Don't Need A Tan 	
A4 - Guinea Pigs 	
A5 - The Maze 	
A6 - Rampage 	
B1 - Maybe 	
B2 - The Mall 	
B3 - Wake Up John 	
B4 - Search And Seizure 	
B5 - Not Another Homicide 	
B6 - A-95

External links
http://articles.latimes.com/1997-05-03/entertainment/ca-55019_1_los-illegals
http://chicanoartmovement.tumblr.com/post/16591131291/los-illegals-performing-el-lay-from-internal

References

Los Illegals albums
1983 albums